Colorado Community Church is a multicultural interdenominational church located in Aurora Colorado, United States.  Colorado Community Church has more than 2000 members and is pastored by Rev. Robert Gelinas.

History
Colorado Community Church was established in 1993 by Dr. Mark Brewer.  The church started under Brewer's conception of a new diverse place of worship in the Denver Metro area. Meetings were held in the fall of 1993 to gather interest in the new church, with the first Sunday services held in January 1994. As the church began to gain more worshipers, it moved from the Hyatt Regency Hotel, to Regis High School, to the Denver Tech Center, before the fall 1995 purchase of a Cherry Hills Village site in Englewood. By 1997, a growing congregation created enough demand for three Sunday services and the consensus to develop multiple campuses in the metro area contrasting the idea of other popular megachurches. Nearby suburb Aurora, is chosen as the location for a second campus with an initial goal of five campuses to open in the metro area within ten years.

In September 1999, services began at Rangeview High School in Aurora under the direction of Rev. Robert Gelinas. Like the initial campus, Aurora experiences phenomenal growth and moves to a newly renovated movie theater complex at Chambers Road and Iliff Avenue in February 2001. In the summer of 2001, CCC experiences the loss of Brewer who leaves to be senior pastor at Bel Air Presbyterian Church in Los Angeles. 2002 saw CCC welcoming Rev. Anthony Pranno as the new senior pastor of the Englewood campus, and Gelinas officially named Lead Senior Pastor of Colorado Community Church. The Aurora Campus' popularity saw the 2004 additions of two Saturday services to join the three Sunday morning worship times, as well as construction of a new worship space named The Upper Room. The Upper Room is located in an adjacent building, renovated to hold 250 people around tables in a different atmosphere than the traditional sanctuary setting. The Upper Room contains a coffee bar, a separate stage, and monitors and projection screens that simulcast the live service. The same year saw the creation of Project 127, a Christian-based adoption agency, which aims to place orphaned children of Colorado with families.

In 2006, Colorado Community Church officially announced Hugo Venegas would be lead pastor of a new campus located in the old Stapleton Airport area of Denver. Base Camp Stapleton opened in March 2007, and offers a bilingual service located at William Roberts Elementary School. Fall 2008 saw the closing of the Stapleton Campus, the bilingual service was moved to Saturday evenings in the Upper Room and has since been moved to Sunday morning at Englewood.  At the end of 2009, Robert Gelinas returned to Aurora as their full-time Sr. Pastor and continues to be the Lead Pastor for Colorado Community Church.  Hugo Venegas was announced as the Sr. Pastor for Englewood in November 2009.

References

External links
 Colorado Community Church Official Web Site

Evangelical megachurches in the United States
Megachurches in Colorado
Evangelical churches in Colorado
Culture of Aurora, Colorado
Englewood, Colorado
Churches in Denver
Christian organizations established in 1993
Buildings and structures in Arapahoe County, Colorado